Muscinupta is a fungal genus that produces small white delicate fan-shaped to cupulate fruitbodies on mosses. It is monotypic, containing the single species Muscinupta laevis. The type species is better known under the name Cyphellostereum laeve but Cyphellostereum is a basidiolichen.

Etymology

The name Muscinupta refers to both its moss host and an allusion to the marriage of the fungus with the moss together with its veil-like properties on the moss.

References

Fungi of Europe
Fungi of North America
Repetobasidiaceae
Monotypic Basidiomycota genera